Mosaic is Experian’s system for geodemographic classification of  households. It applies the principles of geodemography to consumer household and individual data collated from a number of government and commercial sources. The statistical development of the system was led by professor Richard Webber in association with Experian in the 1980s and it has been regularly refreshed and reclassified since then, each based on more recent data from national censuses and other sources. Since its initial development in the UK, the Mosaic brand name has also been used to market separate products which classify other national consumers including most of Western Europe, USA, selected Asian regions and Australia.

The initial UK version was based at the postcode level, which would cover an average of 20 properties with the same code. More recent versions have been developed at the individual household level and offer more accurate classification based on specific characteristics of each household. The 2009 Mosaic UK version for example classified the UK population into 15 main socio-economic groups and, within this, 67 different types.

Professor Webber also developed the competing ACORN system with CACI.  Both Mosaic and Acorn have found application outside their original purpose of direct marketing, including governmental estimates and forecasts and it is regularly employed by life insurance companies and pension funds in the UK to assess longevity for pricing and reserving. Both are also used extensively in understanding local service users, although Mosaic’s naming has proved to be controversial leading Experian to introduce Mosaic Public Sector with more politically correct segment names.

Mosaic 2004 Classification Groups and Types
Source - Mosaic Geodemographics Summary

Mosaic classifies the UK into 11 Main Groups and 61 distinct types.  detailed description link may be more relevant

References

External links
Guardian article referencing Mosaic
 http://observer.guardian.co.uk/uk_news/story/0,6903,1227910,00.html
 http://technology.guardian.co.uk/online/story/0,,1428612,00.html
 http://property.timesonline.co.uk/tol/life_and_style/property/buying_and_selling/article1390447.ece
 http://www.prnewswire.co.uk/cgi/news/release?id=181549
 http://education.guardian.co.uk/primaryeducation/story/0,,1719385,00.html
 http://www.channel4.com/news/microsites/E/election2005_features/new_feature.html
 http://news.bbc.co.uk/1/low/uk_politics/vote_2005/frontpage/4485507.stm
 http://society.guardian.co.uk/e-public/story/0,13927,1420204,00.html

Demographics of the United Kingdom
Geodemographic databases
Geographical databases in the United Kingdom
Market research
Market segmentation
Postcodes in the United Kingdom